Magdalena Piekarska (born 28 November 1986) is a Polish fencer. She competed at the 2012 Summer Olympics in the Women's épée, but was defeated in the second round.

At the 2011 World Championships, she finished in 5th place in the individual and 6th in the team event.  She had finished in 5th at the 2010 World Championships also.

She began fencing at 12.

References

Polish female fencers
1986 births
Living people
Olympic fencers of Poland
Fencers at the 2012 Summer Olympics
Fencers from Warsaw
Fencers at the 2020 Summer Olympics
21st-century Polish women